Collaborative virtual environments are used for collaboration and interaction of possibly many participants that may be spread over large distances. Typical examples are distributed simulations, 3D multiplayer games, collaborative engineering software, collaborative learning applications, and others. The applications are usually based on the shared virtual environment. Because of the spreading of participants and the communication latency, some data consistency model have to be used to keep the data consistent.

The consistency model influences deeply the programming model of the application. One classification is introduced in  based on several criteria, like centralized/distributed architecture, type of replication, and performance and consistency properties. Four types of consistency models were described, covering the most frequently used types of collaborative virtual environment architecture:

 Centralized primaries
 All primary replicas of each data item resides on the same computer called server.
 Advantages: complete server control over the scene
 Disadvantages: performance is limited by the server computer
 Distributed primaries
 Primary replicas are distributed among the computers.
 Advantages: high performance and scalability
 Disadvantages: difficult programming model, weaker consistency
 Used in: Distributed Interactive Simulation, Repo-3D,
 Data ownership
 Primaries are allowed to migrate among the computers. This approach is often called system with transferable data ownership.
 Advantages: more flexibility compared to Distributed Primaries
 Disadvantages: high amount of ownership requests may limit the system performance
 Used in: MASSIVE-3/HIVEK, Blue-c, CIAO, SPLINE

 Active replication
 Active replication uses peer-to-peer approach while all replicas are equal. Usually, atomic broadcast is used to deliver updates to all of them, thus they are kept synchronized.
 Advantages: complete scene synchronization (equal scene content on all computers)
 Disadvantages: the performance is limited by the slowest computer in the system
 Used in: active transactions, Age of Empires, Avango, DIVE

References

Virtual reality
Applications of distributed computing